Westminster House Club House is a historic settlement house clubhouse located in the Broadway-Fillmore neighborhood of Buffalo, Erie County, New York. It was built in 1909–1910, and is a two-story, "L"-shaped, red brick building with Craftsman style design elements. It features broad overhanging eaves with paired brackets and a raised basement.  The building is the last of a complex of buildings operated by Westminster Presbyterian Church that housed social welfare activities that largely benefited the German immigrant community on Buffalo's East Side in the early 20th century.

It was listed on the National Register of Historic Places in 2018.

References

External links

Buffalo Rising: Adams Street Senior Housing Project Proposed

Clubhouses on the National Register of Historic Places in New York (state)
American Craftsman architecture in New York (state)
Buildings and structures completed in 1909
Buildings and structures in Buffalo, New York
National Register of Historic Places in Buffalo, New York
Settlement houses in the United States